Abner Vickery (September 11, 1879 – June 25, 1931) was an American golfer. He competed in the men's individual event at the 1904 Summer Olympics.

References

External links
 

1879 births
1931 deaths
Amateur golfers
American male golfers
Olympic golfers of the United States
Golfers at the 1904 Summer Olympics
People from Ottawa, Kansas
Sportspeople from Kansas